Cyclohexanethiol is a thiol with the formula C6H11SH. It is a colorless liquid with a strong odor.

Preparation
It was first prepared by the free-radical reaction of cyclohexane using carbon disulfide as a sulfur source.

It is produced industrially by the hydrogenation of cyclohexanone in the presence of hydrogen sulfide over a metal sulfide catalyst:
C6H10O  +  H2S  +  H2   →   C6H11SH  +  H2O
It is also obtained by the addition of hydrogen sulfide to cyclohexene in the presence of nickel sulfide.

Safety
The  (injected, mice) was estimated at 316 mg/kg by the United States Department of Health, Education, and Welfare.

References 

Cyclohexyl compounds
Thiols
Foul-smelling chemicals